Sai Than Naing (born 22 September 1961) is a Burmese politician who currently serves as a Member of Parliament in the House of Representatives for Hpapun constituency. He previously served as an Amyotha Hluttaw MP for Kayin State No. 5 constituency.

Early life and education
He was born on 22 September 1961 in Hpapun, Kayin State, Myanmar. He graduated with B.A and B.Ed. He has worked a school teacher.

Political career
He is a member of the Union Solidarity and Development Party. In the 2010 Myanmar general election, he was elected as an Amyotha Hluttaw MP for Kayin State No. 5 constituency.

In the 2015 Myanmar general election, he was elected as a House of Representatives MP for Hpapun constituency.

References

Union Solidarity and Development Party politicians
1961 births
Living people
People from Kayin State
Burmese people of Shan descent